Cosimo De Giorgi or Arcangelo Cosimo De Giorgi (9 February 1842 – 22 December 1922) was an Italian scientist.

Biography

Early life and education
Cosimo De Giorgi completed his early studies in Martano, his home town, and then continue them in Lecce at the Real Collegio of the Jesus. After completing his school studies he moved, with a daring journey (eight days for the only portion Lecce-Napoli), in Pisa, where he attend the University of Pisa medical school, following the family tradition. There, on 14 June 1864, he graduated in medicine. Then, he attend the Higher Institute of Florence in 1865 to specialize in medicine and surgery in the next year.
Meanwhile, in the intention to continue their studies abroad, he had learned English, French and German. But the prospect faded early due to a family tragedy: in 1867 his father died for cholera. De Giorgi was forced to return to Lizzanello. Therefore, taken the medical profession and settled in Lecce with his mother and two brothers.

Activity 
Throughout his life he integrated the medical profession, the teaching profession at the School Tecnico-Normale of Lecce (since 1870) and at the Educatorio Femminile (since 1875). He later added to these intensive research and study in the fields of paleontology, archeology, geography, hydrography, meteorology, geology, seismology, agriculture and hygiene.

Awards and honors 
In 1880 he was awarded the title of Knight of the Order of the Crown of Italy

In 1898, at the suggestion of Father Francesco Denza, he was appointed member of the Pontifical Academy of the New Lynxes.

He was vice president of the Italian Meteoric Association.

There is a school in Lecce, Liceo Scientifico C. De Giorgi, named in his honor.

The municipality of Lizzanello has dedicated the Middle School and the way in which he was born.

Publications 
Cosimo De Giorgi published many works connected to his researches and studies. These publications are conserved in the Fondo de Giorgi at Biblioteca Provinciale N. Bernardini of Lecce.

A bibliography of Cosimo De Giorgi's collection is:
 Antonio Caiuli (cured by), Bibliografia di Cosimo De Giorgi, Congedo Editore, Galatina, 2002 .

Some of his works are recently published:
 La Provincia di Lecce –Bozzetti di viaggio. Editore Giuseppe Spacciante, Lecce, 1882, (reprinted by Congedo Editore, Galatina, 1975)
 Viaggio nel Cilento. Giuseppe Galzerano Editore. 1995 (original title: Da Salerno al Cilento. M. Cellini & C., Firenze, 1882)
 Cilento - Geologia, Idrografia. Giuseppe Galzerano Editore, 2003
Cosimo De Giorgi's correspondence:
 Ennio De Simone, Epistolario di Cosimo De Giorgi: regesti|, Galatina, EdiPan, 2003, .
 Ennio De Simone, Carteggi di Cosimo De Giorgi: regesti e lettere scelte, Galatina, EdiPan, 2007, .
Additional works:
 Tracce d'antichità preistoriche nella Messapia. Bullettino di Paletnologia Italiana, 1882, 8, pp. 194–200.
 Un monumento arcaico ed una stazione con selcin megalitiche in Basilicata. Bullettino di Paletnologia Italiana, 1880, 6, pp. 77–79
 Un gruppo di dolmen fra Calimera e Melendugno in Terra d'Otranto. Bullettino di Paletnologia Italiana, 1911, 37, pp. 6–16
 I monumenti megalitici in Terra d'Otranto. Napoli, 1879
 I menhirs in Terra d'Otranto. Roma, 1880
 Monumenti del XV e XVI secolo nel Cilento. Roma, 1881
 Ricerche sul clima di Lecce. Lecce, 1982
 Antichità preistoriche della Messapia. Reggio Emilia, 1882
 Una carta topografica delle paludi e della malaria forte e debole in Terra d'Otranto. Lecce, 1884
 Note statistiche sul clima di Lecce. Lecce, 1885
 Note sull'idrografia della provincia di Lecce. Lecce, 1886
 Nuovi studi e ricerche sul clima della penisola salentina. Lecce, 1887
 La meteorologia e le sue applicazioni. Lecce, 1888
 L'Osservatorio di Lecce: sua storia. Lecce, 1888
 Note e ricerche sui materiali edilizi adoperati nella provincia di Lecce.Bari, 1901
 Cenni autobiografici. Lecce, 1914

Bibliography 
  Università di Lecce - Il Salento e la scienza

1922 deaths
1842 births
19th-century Italian scientists
People from Lecce
University of Pisa alumni